The 1968 United States presidential election in West Virginia took place on November 5, 1968, as part of the 1968 United States presidential election. West Virginia voters chose seven representatives, or electors, to the Electoral College, who voted for president and vice president.

West Virginia was won by the Democratic candidate, Vice President Hubert Humphrey, with 49.60 percent of the popular vote, against the Republican candidate, former Senator and Vice President Richard Nixon, with 40.78 percent of the popular vote. American Party candidate and former and future Alabama Governor George Wallace also appeared on the ballot, finishing with 9.62 percent of the popular vote.

West Virginia was Wallace’s weakest antebellum slave state, whilst it was Humphrey’s strongest as it had been for outgoing President Johnson. Wallace fared best in the Eastern Panhandle, urbanised Kanawha County and the emerging Rust Belt of the extreme Northern Panhandle, but even in those areas he did not crack a sixth of the vote in any county.

Strong unionisation meant that the state’s predominant poverty-stricken white population did not turn to Wallace in significant numbers. The state’s relative loyalty to Humphrey was enhanced by its deep ties to the New Deal and the resultant unionisation, as in all of Appalachian coal country between the 1930s and 1990s. This was helped by the fact that Johnson focused on this state, alongside Texas and culturally allied Kentucky, as critical for Humphrey’s hope of regaining the White House. Humphrey nonetheless did lose eighteen percent on Johnson’s record performance from 1964, and Nixon was the first Republican victor in Hardy County since Abraham Lincoln in 1864, and the first to carry Pendleton County since Ulysses S. Grant in 1868.

Results

Results by county

Notes

References

West Virginia
1968
1968 West Virginia elections